The Bartercard Cup was a rugby league club competition in New Zealand that ran from 2000 until 2007. Bartercard Cup seasons 2000–2002 may refer to:

2000 Bartercard Cup
2001 Bartercard Cup
2002 Bartercard Cup